Nataliia Yevhenivna Moskvina (born 9 June 1988 in Kharkiv) is a Ukrainian individual and synchronised trampoline gymnast, representing her nation at international competitions. She won the bronze medal at the 2013 World Games in Cali, Colombia. 

She participated at the 2015 European Games in Baku. She competed at world championships, including at the 2009, 2010, 2011, 2013, 2014 and 2015 Trampoline World Championships.

She won the gold medal in Women's Synchro at  The World Games 2017 in Wrocław, Poland.

Personal
She lives in Kharkiv, in the city where she also was born. She is also in the army.

References

External links
 
 http://www.espn.com/olympics/summer/2016/results/_/discipline/23/event/236
 http://www.gettyimages.com/photos/nataliia-moskvina
 https://www.youtube.com/watch?v=QHLPLjkTH0E

1988 births
Living people
Sportspeople from Kharkiv
Ukrainian female trampolinists
Olympic gymnasts of Ukraine
Gymnasts at the 2016 Summer Olympics
European Games competitors for Ukraine
Gymnasts at the 2015 European Games
Medalists at the Trampoline Gymnastics World Championships
World Games gold medalists
Competitors at the 2017 World Games
20th-century Ukrainian women
21st-century Ukrainian women